Siti Aishah binti Shaik Ismail (Jawi: سيتي عائشة بنت شيخ إسماعيل) is a Malaysian politician. She was a senator elected by the Penang State Legislative Assembly in the Parliament of Malaysia. Her term started from 22 June 2015 and expired on 2 June 2018.

Election results

References

Living people
Date of birth missing (living people)
People's Justice Party (Malaysia) politicians
Members of the Dewan Negara
Year of birth missing (living people)